Foldsjøen is a reservoir located on the border of Møre og Romsdal and Trøndelag counties in Norway.  It is located in the municipalities of Surnadal and Rindal. The lake is dammed from the Folda River and the water is used in the Trollheim power station. Slightly more elevated and directly to the south is the Gråsjøen reservoir, which is also behind a hydro-power dam.

See also
List of lakes in Norway

References

Surnadal
Rindal
Lakes of Møre og Romsdal
Lakes of Trøndelag
Reservoirs in Norway